Qala Saints F.C. is a football club from the village of Qala in Gozo, Malta. The club was founded in 1968 and is named after the village patron Saint Joseph. They play in the Gozo Football League. 

The team's traditional colours are maroon and light blue. The nicknames used for the players are the "Maroons" or the "Saints". Qala Saints's main are Nadur Youngsters F.C. along with Ghajnsielem F.C.

In the summer of 2010, the club changed its name to Qala Saints F.C..

History
The Maroons have never been main contenders for the top honours in Gozo in the past. However, in the 2007/2008 season, the club won two of the major honours offered by Gozitan football – the G.F.A Cup and the Super Cup for the first time in the club's history. Other past honours won include the Second Division League on four occasions (1976/77, 1994/95, 2005/06 and 2021/2022), and the Second Division Knock/Out Cup on two occasions (2004/05 and 2005/06).

Qala Saints F.C. played in the Second Division was during the 2005/06 season, in which they were able to win the Second Division League and Cup double.  The Saints won the Second Division League without conceding a single loss during the 2005/06 season. Furthermore, their foreign import, Ishaku Umoru, was joint top scorer in the Second Division League and Joseph Xerri was voted as Best Second Division League Player during this memorable season. During the 2008–2009 season the Maroons ended the bottom of the First Division and hence were relegated to the Second Division. After a promising start to the season, winning the first knockout competition, Qala were expected to mount a serious challenge for promotion in 2009–10. A couple of disappointing results meant the team lost ground early on, and soon the results went from bad to worse. The team couldn't even go beyond last place in the standings.

2022/23 squad

Goalkeepers:
Franklin Xuereb,
Kenny Grima (C)

Defenders:
Joseph Attard,
Joao Victor Ferrari Silva  ,
Fransisco Mumford,
Gabriel Sillato,
Samuel Sillato,
Armando Xerri

Midfielders:
Joseph Buttigieg
Michael Mumford,
Malcolm Cefai,
Christoph Caruana,
Daniel Portelli,
Simon Spiteri 

Forwards:
Jake Mifsud,
Rafael Conrado Prudente 
Shaun Attard 

The club's main sponsor for the current season are K & S Decorators, Paul Michael Mini Market, along with Xerri L- Bukkett and D Bar, Sportika and Urban Jungle – the local representatives of international sportsware company Nike.

External links
Qala Saints FC Official Website
Qala St. Joseph F.C. Nursery website

Football clubs in Malta
Gozitan football clubs
1968 establishments in Malta
Qala, Malta